The 1966 UCI Road World Championships took place on 28 August 1966 at the Nürburgring, Germany.

Results

Medal table

External links 

 Men's results
 Women's results
  Results at sportpro.it

 
UCI Road World Championships by year
UCI Road World Championships 1966
Uci Road World Championships, 1966
Uci Road World Championships, 1966